Gopinathpur may refer to any of the following villages:

Bangladesh 
 Gopinathpur, Bangladesh

India 
 Gopinathpur, Baleshwar, Baleshwar district, Odisha
 Gopinathpur, Golanthara, Golanthara, Ganjam district, Odisha
 Gopinathpur, Hinjili, Hinjili municipality, Ganjam district, Odisha
 Gopinathpur, Tarasingi, Tarasingi, Ganjam district, Odisha
 Gopinathpur, West Bengal, Purba Bardhaman district, West Bengal, India